Gaspar Araújo (born 17 December 1981) is a Portuguese long jumper.

His personal best is 8.10 metres, achieved in June 2004 in Istanbul.

Competition record

References

1981 births
Living people
Portuguese male long jumpers
Athletes (track and field) at the 2004 Summer Olympics
Olympic athletes of Portugal